Phillip Dequan Nolan (born November 3, 1993) is an American former basketball player. He played college basketball for the Connecticut Huskies.

Nolan was on the Huskies' 2013–14 NCAA Championship team. He played  for Team FOG Næstved in Denmark in the 2016-2017 season. In 2017, Nolan made a game-winning free throw that won Fog Næstved the Basketligaen championship.

College statistics

|-
| style="text-align:left;"| 2012–13
| style="text-align:left;"| Connecticut
| 23 || 1 || 10.8 || .429 || .000 || .529 || 2.1 || .3 || 0 || .5 || 1.4
|-
| style="text-align:left;"| 2013–14
| style="text-align:left;"| Connecticut
| 40 || 19 || 14.2 || .526 || .000 || .775 || 2.4 || .2 || .2 || .5 || 3.3
|-
| style="text-align:left;"| 2014–15
| style="text-align:left;"| Connecticut
| 34 || 10 || 15.2 || .469 || .000 || .286 || 1.9 || .1 || .2 || .4 || 1.5
|-
| style="text-align:left;"| 2015–16
| style="text-align:left;"| Connecticut
| 32 || 13 || 10.6 || .537 || .000 || .818 || 1.5 || .2 || .1 || .3 || 1.7
|-
| style="text-align:left;"| Career
| style="text-align:left;"| 
| 129 || 43 || 12.7 || .490 || .000 || .602 || 2.0 || .2 || .1 || .4 || 2.0
|-

References

1993 births
Living people
American expatriate basketball people in Denmark
American men's basketball players
Basketball players from Milwaukee
UConn Huskies men's basketball players
Centers (basketball)
Power forwards (basketball)